Stenochariergus is a genus of beetles in the family Cerambycidae, containing the following species:

 Stenochariergus dorianae Giesbert & Hovore, 1989
 Stenochariergus hollyae Giesbert & Hovore, 1989

References

Rhinotragini